Intelsat 10-02 (or IS 10-02, Intelsat 1002, IS-1002, Intelsat Alpha-2, Intelsat X-02 and Thor 10-02 ) is a communications satellite operated by Intelsat. Intelsat 10-02 is the first operational communications satellite to have its service life extended by Mission Extension Vehicle-2, while still in service, in 2021.

Launch 
Intelsat 10-02 was launched by a Proton-M launch vehicle from Baikonur Cosmodrome, Kazakhstan, at 22:27:00 UTC on 16 June 2004.

Capacity and coverage 
The  satellite provides digital broadcasting, telephone, and broadband internet access to users in Europe, South America, Africa and the Middle East through its 36 Ku-band, and 70 C-band transponders after parking over 1° West longitude.

Thor 10-02 
Telenor uses half of the Ku-band capacity of the satellite, which is marketed as Thor 10-02.

Docking to MEV-2 
On 12 April 2021, Northrop Grumman's MEV-2 satellite successfully rendezvoused and docked to Intelsat 10-02. MEV-2 will extend IS 10-02's service life by returning it to a proper geosynchronous orbit. The maneuver was completed at 17:34 UTC, marking the first time a satellite servicer has docked with an in-service commercial satellite in geosynchronous orbit (GEO). The two spacecraft will stay locked together for five years to extend the life of IS 10-02, which was running low on fuel after being in orbit since 2004.

See also 

 2004 in spaceflight
 Mission Extension Vehicle

References

External links 
 
 Airbus Defence and Space communications satellites

Intelsat satellites
Satellites using the Eurostar bus
Spacecraft launched in 2004